Lee Seung-bok, (December 9, 1959  December 9, 1968) was a 9-year-old South Korean boy murdered by North Korean commandos on December 9, 1968. His murder was widely publicised throughout South Korea. In the early 1990s it was claimed that Lee had never existed and that his death was the creation of South Korean propaganda.

Early life
Lee Seung-bok was the second of four children of Lee Seok-woo and Joo Dae-ha and was raised on their farm in a remote location on the north of Gyebang mountain.

Death
On the night of 30 October 1968, 120 members of Unit 124 of the Korean People's Army landed at 8 separate locations between Ulchin – Samcheok in Gangwon province and moved inland on a 30-day mission to create guerilla bases in the Taebaek Mountains. On the morning of 31 October they entered several villages and began indoctrinating the villagers, several of whom slipped away to alert the authorities. Republic of Korea Army forces soon arrived in the area and began hunting down the infiltrators.

On the night of 9 December several North Korean commandos burst into the Lee household demanding food and shelter. The North Koreans asked Lee Seung-bok if he preferred North Korea or South Korea. When he replied that he preferred South Korea, the North Koreans began to beat him. Lee then said "I hate Communists," this enraged the North Koreans who proceeded to kill Lee, his mother Joo Dae-ha (33), younger brother Lee Seung-su (7) and younger sister Lee Seung-Ja (4). Lee's father Lee Seok-woo and older brother Lee Hak-gwan managed to escape from the house and raised the alarm. The North Koreans proceeded to mutilate Lee Seung-bok's face by giving him a half Glasgow smile. The North Koreans fled the Lee house and were never identified, but they may have been among the 113 members of Unit 124 killed by South Korean forces.

Conspiracy theory
In the early 1990s rumours began to circulate that Lee never existed and the story of his murder had been created by propaganda units of the South Korean military governments. In July 1999 prosecutors charged Kim Ju-eon the former general secretary of the People's Coalition for Media Reform with defamation after he included the December 11, 1968 The Chosun Ilbo report, entitled, "I Don't Like the Communist Party. A Young Mouth of Resistance Torn," in an "Exhibition of Misreporting" and called the reports of the incident a lie. In September 2002, Kim was found guilty and was sentenced to 6-months in prison. In October 2004, the Seoul Central District Court sentenced Kim to six months prison and two years probation for "spreading false facts" and concluded that the incident had taken place and that the media reports at the time were accurate.

Memorials
The Lee Seung-bok Memorial Center  was established in 1982 south of Lee's home in Nodong-ri, Gangwon, South Korea . The memorial center contains a memorial hall showing photos and paintings of Lee's life, death and burial. The Lee family house was moved to the park from Gyebang Mountain. An outdoor static park contains a Northrop F-5, a Cessna O-1, an M4 Sherman and various artillery pieces. The graves of Lee and his family are located within the park area.

References

1959 births
1968 murders in South Korea
1968 deaths
1968 in South Korea
1968 in military history
20th-century South Korean people
Aftermath of the Korean War
Incidents of violence against boys
Male murder victims
Murdered South Korean children
North Korea–South Korea relations
People whose existence is disputed